Martin Gerald Simmons (October 3, 1926 – April 29, 2020) was an American film and television producer, newspaper reporter for the New York World-Telegram and Sun, and Executive Vice President of Diners Club, the first credit card company. Simmons gained his greatest fame while serving as the chief executive officer of Twenty First Century Communications (renamed National Lampoon Inc., after its best known product).

Life and career
Simmons was born in Brooklyn, New York in 1926, the son of Kate (Shapiro), a homemaker, and Irving Simmons, a sign painter. Founded in 1967 by Simmons and fellow Diner's Club refugee Len Mogel, Twenty First Century Communications Inc. was created to publish a "counterculture" magazine called Cheetah. While Cheetah failed, the partners had more success in the 1970s with Weight Watchers and National Lampoon magazines. Under Simmons' direction, National Lampoon's entire editorial staff was fired and replaced with his children (Michael Simmons and Andy Simmons), as well as Peter Kleinman and Larry Sloman.  The magazine expanded into radio, theater, records and film. In March 1989, Simmons sold his ten-percent share in National Lampoon Inc. (Twenty First Century Communications having been renamed in 1979) to film producers Daniel Grodnik and Tim Matheson for six dollars a share (more than $761,400), resigned as chairman of the board, and departed the company along with his son Michael Simmons.

Simmons's film credits included acting as the producer of National Lampoon's Animal House and the National Lampoon's Vacation film series.

He wrote seven books.  His last one, Fat, Drunk, and Stupid: The Making of Animal House, was published by St. Martin's Press in 2012.

On April 29, 2020, Simmons died at the age of 93 in Los Angeles from a brief illness.

References

External links
 
 Obituary

1926 births
2020 deaths
American chief executives
Film producers from New York (state)
American financial businesspeople
American magazine publishers (people)
American newspaper reporters and correspondents
Businesspeople from Brooklyn
Television producers from New York City
Journalists from New York City
National Lampoon people
Writers from Brooklyn